Brahmbhatt is an Indian surname. Notable people with this surname include:

 Bali Brahmbhatt (fl. 1993–2012), Bollywood playback singer and rapper
 Harsh Brahmbhatt (born 1954), Indian language poet and writer
 Radha Brahmbhatt (fl. 2008), Indian delegate to Miss International 2008
 Akshay Brahmbhatt (born 1996), Indian cricketer

See also
 Brahm Bhat, the surname Bhat, associated with the Indian Brahmin caste

Indian surnames